Terry Beech  (born April 2, 1981) is a Canadian politician who was elected as a Member of Parliament in the House of Commons of Canada to represent the federal electoral district of Burnaby North—Seymour during the 2015 Canadian federal election.

In 1999, Beech, then aged 18, was elected to the Nanaimo City Council, becoming British Columbia's youngest-ever elected official.  He served on the council for three years, and did not seek re-election, instead moving to Burnaby to pursue a degree at Simon Fraser University. After completing a joint major in business and economics there, he attended Oxford University, finishing with an MBA.  After finishing his education, he pursued a variety of business and charitable activities.

Beech was nominated as the Liberal candidate in Burnaby North—Seymour in July 2014, and won the election in the following October.

From 2015 to 2017, Beech served as Parliamentary Secretary to the Minister of Science. In January 2017, Beech was named Parliamentary Secretary to the Minister of Fisheries, Oceans, and the Canadian Coast Guard. He held this role until August 2018, when he was named Parliamentary Secretary to the Minister of Transport. On December 12, 2019, it was announced that Beech would once again serve as the Parliamentary Secretary to the Minister of Fisheries, Oceans, and the Canadian Coast Guard.

In November  2018, Beech was awarded Maclean's Magazine's Parliamentarian of the Year for Best Civic Outreach.

Background
Beech was born in Comox, British Columbia, and moved to Victoria, British Columbia when he was one. His father worked as a janitor and his mother was a housewife. While in Victoria, Beech attended Arbutus Junior High School before moving on to Mount Douglas Senior Secondary School. He later moved to Nanaimo, British Columbia, and attended John Barsby Secondary School. While in grade 12, he coached the debate team and sat on the board of the Harewood Community Project Society.

In 2006, Beech and his twin brother, Doug, founded a non-profit organization called Twinbro Local Leaders. Twinbro was created to empower youth, and help them access post-secondary education, regardless of their social and economic background.

While working on his MBA at Oxford University, Beech started tech company, HiretheWorld in his dorm room. In 2010, HiretheWorld won the BCIC New Ventures Competition, and in 2012, it was named one of BC Business Magazine's top 20 most innovative companies.

Beech has taught entrepreneurship and finance courses as an adjunct professor at Simon Fraser University and the University of British Columbia, and helped redesign the entrepreneurship program at Simon Fraser.

In 2010/11, Beech participated in the Action Canada program, where he co-authored, "Fueling Canada's Economic Success: A National Strategy for High-Growth Entrepreneurship."

Municipal Politics

Beech was elected to Nanaimo City Council in 1999 at age 18, becoming British Columbia's youngest-ever elected official. While councillor, he sat on the Advisory Committee on the Environment, and the Joint Use Committee with School District 68 Nanaimo-Ladysmith.

Burnaby North-Seymour Member of Parliament

In the 2015 Canadian federal election, Beech defeated New Democratic Party candidate and former Chief Judge of the Provincial Court of British Columbia, Carol Baird Ellan by 3,401 votes. Beech also defeated Conservative Party candidate and now Mayor of the District of North Vancouver, Mike Little, by 4,326 votes. After the election, Beech was appointed the Parliamentary Secretary to the Minister of Science. In January 2017, Beech was named Parliamentary Secretary to the Minister of Fisheries, Oceans, and the Canadian Coast Guard. During his tenure, Beech worked on the modernization of Canada's Fisheries Act. Part of that work included changes to the Act that restored prohibitions against the harmful alteration, disruption or destruction of fish habitat ("HADD"). Beech also worked on Bill C-55, An Act to amend the Oceans Act and the Canada Petroleum Resources Act, which outlined new steps for the creation and regulation of Marine Protected Areas. Beech held this role until August 2018, when he was named Parliamentary Secretary to the Minister of Transport. While at Transport, Beech worked closely on Bill C-64 - Wrecked, Abandoned or Hazardous Vessels Act, which addressed irresponsible vessel management.

In 2018, Beech was awarded Parliamentarian of the Year for Best Civic Outreach. These awards are voted on by Members of Parliament from all Parties. Beech attributes winning this award to his efforts to engage with constituents and by perpetually knocking on doors in his riding.

In the 2019 Canadian federal election, Beech quashed the comeback attempt of New Democratic Candidate, Svend Robinson, who had previously served as MP in Burnaby from 1979-2004. Beech also defeated Heather Leung, a candidate who was dropped by the Conservative Party after controversial videos featuring Leung surfaced in October 2019.

On December 12, 2019, Beech was once again named Parliamentary Secretary to the Minister of Fisheries, Oceans, and Canadian Coast Guard.

On February 4, 2020, Beech was chosen by fellow caucus members to become the Chair of the Federal Liberal Pacific Caucus, compose of Liberal MPs from British Columbia.

In the 2021 Canadian federal election, Beech was re-elected with 39.4% of the vote defeating NDP challenger Jim Hanson.

On December 3, 2021, Terry Beech was named Parliamentary Secretary to Chrystia Freeland, the Deputy Prime Minister and Minister of Finance.

Electoral record

Personal life
In 2013, Beech married his wife, Ravi Bansal Beech, who is the COO of Valley Acrylic Bath Ltd, and one of the 2018 Business in Vancouver's 40 under 40. They have two daughters together, Nova and Solar.

References

External links

Liberal Party of Canada MPs
Living people
1981 births
Members of the House of Commons of Canada from British Columbia
Alumni of the University of Oxford
Alumni of Saïd Business School
Simon Fraser University alumni
Nanaimo city councillors
People from Burnaby
People from Comox, British Columbia
21st-century Canadian politicians